Ivonete Dantas Silva (born 16 August 1959) is a Brazilian politician and businesswoman. The current assemblywomen for her hometown of Caicó, she served as the town's secretary of public assistance, as a state representative, and as a member of the federal senate of Brazil from 2011 to 2015.

Personal life
Dantas was born to Tamires Silva and Maria Dantas Silva. She is one of 6 children. She married young and was a mother at 17 and a grandmother at 37. She was a businesswoman prior to entering politics.

Political career
Dantas succeeded Garibaldi Alves after his retirement from the federal senate in 2014. She was elected to the city council in 2016 with 878 votes.

References

1959 births
Living people
Women mayors of places in Brazil
Members of the Federal Senate (Brazil)
Members of the Legislative Assembly of Rio Grande do Norte
Brazilian Democratic Movement politicians
People from Rio Grande do Norte
Brazilian businesspeople